Maciej Jewtuszko (born January 31, 1981) is a Polish mixed martial artist who most recently competed in 2019. A professional since 2005, he has fought in the UFC, WEC, and KSW. He is the former KSW Lightweight Champion.

Background
Jewtuszko comes from a Muay Thai and Brazilian Jiu-Jitsu background.
He is currently ranked as the #2 Polish lightweight mixed martial artist by mmarocks.pl

Jewtuszko has fought for promotions in Poland and Germany, as well as the Dutch promotion BOTE, one of the largest MMA promotions in Europe, defeating solid opponents like Edvardas Norkeliunas and Grzegorz Trędowski. After going 7-0 (never out of the second round), Jewtuszko attracted the attention of larger promotions. Maciej has also competed in the sport of Muay Thai.

Mixed martial arts career

World Extreme Cagefighting
Jewtuszko then signed for the WEC and made his debut at WEC 50 - where he was regarded as a heavy underdog
 - against Anthony Njokuani. Jewtuszko went on to defeat his opponent via TKO (punches) early in the first round. By doing so, he was awarded the Knockout of the Night bonus.
Maciej was scheduled to make his second World Extreme Cagefighting appearance against Ricardo Lamas at WEC 53, but had to withdraw as he suffered a broken hand during training.

Ultimate Fighting Championship
In October 2010, World Extreme Cagefighting merged with the Ultimate Fighting Championship. As part of the merger, all WEC fighters were transferred to the UFC.

Jewtuszko faced Curt Warburton on February 27, 2011 at UFC 127 and suffered his first loss of his professional career via unanimous decision. After the loss, Jewtuszko was released from the promotion.

KSW
Jewtuszko made his Konfrontacja Sztuk Walki debut at KSW 17 against Artur Sowiński, losing after being knocked out by punches 46 seconds into the first round.

He then fought Ultimate Fighter contestant Dean Amasinger at KSW 18, winning the fight via TKO (punches).

Jewtuszko then rematched Artur Sowiński at KSW 21 to crown the first KSW Lightweight Champion. This time around, Jewtuszko won via submission (d'arce choke) in the second round to claim the title.

At KSW 24, Jewtuszko scheduled to defend his KSW Lightweight title against Andre Winner. However, he was replaced by Mateusz Gamrot in the weeks before the event. Gamrot went on to defeat Winner and earned himself a title shot in the process.

Personal life
Maciej is a firefighter in his hometown of Szczecin, Poland.

Championships and accomplishments
Konfrontacja Sztuk Walki
KSW Lightweight Championship (One time)
Knockout of the Night (Two times) vs. Dean Amasinger, Vaso Bakocevic 
World Extreme Cagefighting
Knockout of the Night (One time) vs. Anthony Njokuani

Mixed martial arts record

|-
| Loss
| align=center| 12–5
| Vaso Bakočević
| TKO (Leg Injury)
| FEN 25: Jewtuszko vs Bakocevic
| 
| align=center|1
| align=center|5:00
| Ostroda ,Poland
| 
|-
| Loss
| align=center| 12–4
| David Zawada
| Decision (Unanimous)
| KSW 40: Dublin
| 
| align=center|3
| align=center|5:00
| Dublin, Ireland
| 
|-
| Win
| align=center| 12–3
| Krzysztof Kulak
| TKO (submission to punches)
| KSW 34: New Order
| 
| align=center| 2
| align=center| 2:18
| Warsaw, Poland
| 
|-
| Loss
| align=center| 11–3
| Kamil Szymuszowski
| Decision (unanimous)
| KSW 31: Materla vs. Drwal
| 
| align=center| 3
| align=center| 5:00
| Gdańsk, Poland
| 
|-
| Win
| align=center| 11–2
| Vaso Bakočević
| TKO (front kick to body & punches)
| KSW 28: Fighters Den
| 
| align=center| 3
| align=center| 3:00
| Szczecin, Poland
| 
|-
| Win
| align=center| 10–2
| Artur Sowinski
| Technical submission (d'arce choke)
| KSW 21: Ultimate Explanation
| 
| align=center| 2
| align=center| 4:01
| Warsaw, Poland
| 
|-
| Win
| align=center| 9–2
| Dean Amasinger
| TKO (punches)
| KSW 18: Unfinished Sympathy
| 
| align=center| 1
| align=center| 3:39
| Plock, Poland
| 
|-
| Loss
| align=center| 8–2
| Artur Sowinski
| KO (punches)
| KSW 17: Revenge
| 
| align=center| 1
| align=center| 0:46
| Lódz, Poland
| 
|-
| Loss
| align=center| 8–1
| Curt Warburton
| Decision (unanimous) 
| UFC 127
| 
| align=center| 3
| align=center| 5:00
| Sydney, Australia
| 
|-
| Win
| align=center| 8–0
| Anthony Njokuani
| TKO (punches)
| WEC 50
| 
| align=center| 1
| align=center| 1:35
| Las Vegas, Nevada, United States
| 
|-
| Win
| align=center| 7–0
| Edvardas Norkeliunas
| Submission (heel hook)
| BOTE: Grabowski vs Kita
| 
| align=center| 1
| align=center| 3:42
| Gdynia, Poland
| 
|-
| Win
| align=center| 6–0
| Erikas Petraitis
| KO (punches)
| IF 2: Iron Fist 2
| 
| align=center| 1
| align=center| 1:38
| Szczecin, Poland
| 
|-
| Win
| align=center| 5–0
| Grzegorz Tredowski
| Submission (guillotine choke)
| BOTE Gdynia
| 
| align=center| 2
| align=center| 0:37
| Gdynia, Poland
| 
|-
| Win
| align=center| 4–0
| Maros Nagy
| TKO (corner stoppage)
| Fight Club Berlin 13
| 
| align=center| 2
| align=center| 5:00
| Berlin, Germany
| 
|-
| Win
| align=center| 3–0
| Tomas Pallai
| Submission (rear-naked choke)
| Fight Club Berlin 12
| 
| align=center| 1
| align=center| 1:37
| Berlin, Germany
| 
|-
| Win
| align=center| 2–0
| Adam Lazowski
| TKO (soccer kicks)
| Extreme Cage 2
| 
| align=center| 1
| align=center| 4:57
| Warsaw, Poland
| 
|-
| Win
| align=center| 1–0
| Dainius Krishtopaitis
| Submission (armbar)
| La Onda: Germany vs. Lithuania
| 
| align=center| 1
| align=center| N/A
| Magdeburg, Germany
|

See also
 List of current mixed martial arts champions
 List of male mixed martial artists

References

External links
 
 

1981 births
Living people
Polish male mixed martial artists
Lightweight mixed martial artists
Mixed martial artists utilizing Muay Thai
Mixed martial artists utilizing Brazilian jiu-jitsu
Polish practitioners of Brazilian jiu-jitsu
Polish Muay Thai practitioners
Sportspeople from Szczecin
Polish firefighters
Ultimate Fighting Championship male fighters